Inscape Education Group (previously Inscape Design College), is a higher education institution which offers contact learning located at campuses in Cape Town, Durban, Pretoria and Johannesburg in South Africa. The institution also offers distance learning through an online platform. In 2018, the Inscape expanded its operations to the United Arab Emirates, establishing a campus in Dubai. It registered with the Department of Higher Education and Training as a private higher education institution under the Higher Education Act of 1997.

Ranking

See also
Inscape (visual art)
Inscape

External links
Official Site

Higher education in South Africa
Educational institutions established in 1981
Design schools
1981 establishments in South Africa